Manish Jha is an Indian film writer and director. known for film like Matrubhoomi.

Early life and education
Born in Dhamaura, in West Champaran district of Bihar, Jha grew up in Delhi where he had moved at an early age. He did his graduation in English from Ramjas College, Delhi University, where he also joined its theatre group aiming to become an actor.

Career
After completing his studies, Jha moved to Mumbai and began working as an assistant director in television serials hoping to get a break. When the break never came, he made a five-minute short film on the homeless putting in Rs 30,000, A Very Very Silent Film, which won the Jury Prize for the Best Short Film at the 2002 Cannes Film Festival.
Thereafter he made his feature debut with Matrubhoomi (2003) about effects of female infanticide, which won a series of awards and critical acclaim. At the 2003 Venice Film Festival, it was presented in the Critic's Week (Parallel section) and later awarded the FIPRESCI Award "For its important theme on women's issues and female infanticide handled with sensitivity by a first-time director".

His next was Anwar (2007), a film set in Lucknow, about stereotyping of Muslims in the post 9/11 era. In 2008, he directed the segment title, "And it Rained" in anthology film, with 11 directors, Mumbai Cutting, which became the closing film of 10th Osian's Cinefan Festival in Delhi.

He next directed a two-hour yoga DVD, Shilpa's Yoga (2008) for actress Shilpa Shetty, shot against the coastal backdrop of Kerala.

Filmography
Director
Matrubhoomi (2003)
 Anwar (2007)
 Mumbai Cutting (segment "And It Rained") (2010)
 The Legend of Michael Mishra (2016)
 Screenwriter
Matrubhoomi (2005)
 Anwar (2007)
 The Legend of Michael Mishra (2016)

Awards
A Very Very Silent Film
 Jury Prize for Matruboomi in the Best Short Film category at the 2002 Cannes Film Festival
 FIPRESCI Award in Parallel Section at the Venice Film Festival 2003
 Audience Award for Best Film at the Kozlin Film Festival 2003, Poland
 Audience Award for Best Foreign Film at Thessaloniki Film Festival, 2003
 Nominated for Golden Alexander (Best Film) at Thessaloniki Film Festival, 2003
 Audience Award for Best Film at River to River. Florence Indian Film Festival, 2003

References

External links
 

Film directors from Bihar
1978 births
Living people
People from West Champaran district
Delhi University alumni
Hindi-language film directors
Indian male screenwriters
Ramjas College alumni